Sir Misha Black  (16 October 1910 – 11 October 1977) was a British-Azerbaijani architect and designer. In 1933 he founded with associates in London the organisation that became the Artists' International Association. In 1943, with Milner Gray and Herbert Read, Sir Misha Black founded Design Research Unit, a London-based Architectural, Graphic Design and Interior Design Company.

He was born in 1910 in Baku, Russian Empire (now Azerbaijan) into a wealthy Jewish family. From 1959 to 1975 Black was a professor of industrial design at the Royal College of Art in London, England. During his tenure at the Royal College of Art, he became President of the International Council of Societies of Industrial Design (Icsid) from 1959 to 1961. He was also a Fellow of the Chartered Society of Designers, and winner of the Minerva Medal, the Society's highest award. He was knighted in 1972. Between 1974 and 1976 Black was President of the Design and Industries Association.

Notable works
Black is remembered largely for his iconic design of the Westminster street name signs, the external styling of British Railways Southern Region British Rail Class 71 electric locomotives of 1958 and Western Region British Rail Class 52 diesel locomotives of 1961. He also designed the London Underground 1967 Stock that was used on the Victoria line between 1967 and 2011. On 27 July 2003 at Salisbury station, preserved Class 52 D1015 named Western Champion was unveiled carrying temporary Sir Misha Black nameplates.

Black is often credited for designing the black/brown/orange/yellow moquette originally used by London Transport and also the West Yorkshire Passenger Transport Executive in the late 1970s onwards; whilst he commissioned the fabric it was actually the work of noted textile designer Jacqueline Groag.

Publications

Family
His brother was the philosopher Max Black.

Legacy

Black is commemorated in The Sir Misha Black Awards, created in 1978 by the Design and Industries Association, the Faculty of Royal Designers for Industry (RDI), and the Royal Academy of Engineering. He was influential in framing the educational discipline of Industrial Design (Engineering) in the UK at the Royal College of Art (RCA) and also the foundation of the academic discipline of design research by facilitating the Professorial role offered to Bruce Archer in the first Department of Design Research at the RCA. 

Recipients of the Sir Misha Black Medal include prestigious design educators such as Max Bill (1982), Ettore Sottsass (1999), Santiago Calatrava (2002), Margaret Calvert (2016) and Professor Birgit Mager (2020). The Sir Misha Black Award for Innovation in Design Education, first awarded in 1999, was given to Arts University Bournemouth in 2016 and the University of Brighton Design Archives in 2018.

See also
 College of Medallists

References

Further reading

External links
Black's moquette design for London Transport
Selected Writings
Sir Misha Black Awards
Royal Designers for Industry & Britain Can Make It

20th-century British architects
Chartered designers
Academics of the Royal College of Art
1910 births
1977 deaths
People from Baku Governorate
Emigrants from the Russian Empire to the United Kingdom
British Jews
Architects from Baku
Officers of the Order of the British Empire
Knights Bachelor